Zahab-e Olya (also Romanized as Z̄ahāb-e ‘Olyā; also known as Z̄ehāb, Zahau, Za Hauz, Zāhū, Zeh Āb, and Zū Ḥowz) is a village in Shusef Rural District, Shusef District, Nehbandan County, South Khorasan Province, Iran. At the 2006 census, its population was 280, in 68 families.

References 

Populated places in Nehbandan County